Des Hackett (1925 – 7 August 1998) was an Australian naturalist. He is credited as being the first person to successfully breed in captivity the  Leadbeater's possum.

References

1925 births
1998 deaths
Australian naturalists
20th-century naturalists